WNYK (88.7 FM) was a radio station broadcasting a Variety format. Licensed to Nyack, New York, United States, the station was last owned by Nyack College.

Programs
Among the many programs that have been featured on this radio station were Class of 2000 Alumni, Christopher Johnson and Clifford Larsen's show, "Two Guys, a Girl, and Radio Show" as well as Dr. Charles Beach's show "Memory Lane", the longest running WNYK program which started in 1994.

The station's license was cancelled on June 2, 2022, due Nyack College failing to file a license renewal application.

References

External links

NYK
Radio stations established in 1983
1983 establishments in New York (state)
Radio stations disestablished in 2022
2022 disestablishments in New York (state)
Defunct radio stations in the United States
NYK